The National Development Party (NDP) was a political party in Kenya which was of national importance between 1994 and 2001. It was founded by Stephen Wilfred Omondi Oludhe.

Becoming Odinga's party
Being a minor political party, until 1994, NDP gained national prominence when Raila Odinga joined it after he left Ford-Kenya following his loss in the battle for leadership of that party to Michael Wamalwa. Odinga pulled Ford members of parliament from Nyanza Province with him. This spike in membership, which included Ford-K's Nyanza MPs, put NDP in the position of a major opposition party in the Kenyan parliament. 
The party managed to retain its strong position in Nyanza region mainly among the Luo population during the 1997 elections when it returned 21 members to parliament.

Co-operation and coalition with KANU
In 2000 NDP started to cooperate with the KANU-government of president Daniel arap Moi. From June 2001 three MPs of NDP joined the cabinet, thus inaugurating the first coalition cabinet in Kenya's history.

2002 merger and split
In spring 2002 NDP merged with KANU. NDP leader Odinga became the Secretary-General of the united Party.  This union was to be short-lived, as from summer 2002 it became obvious that arap Moi was determined to have Uhuru Kenyatta as his successor, which was confirmed by a KANU congress in October 2002. Odinga, who had been aware of manipulated lists of delegates, pulled out from the congress together with his followers from the former NDP and was joined by a number of KANU politicians who protested against Moi's manipulation of the party meeting in favour of his chosen candidate. Together, the group, which called itself the Rainbow Coalition, quit the ruling party and then joined the then-minor Liberal Democratic Party, which was to be one of the founding members of the National Rainbow Coalition which went on to win the 2002 presidential and parliamentary elections.

References

Defunct political parties in Kenya
Political parties established in 1991
1991 establishments in Kenya